A number of concerns and controversies surfaced before the 2010 Commonwealth Games in New Delhi, India, which received widespread media coverage both in India (the host nation) and the rest of the world.

The Commonwealth Games was severely criticised by several prominent Indian politicians and social activists because millions of dollars have been spent on the sporting event despite the fact that India has one of the world's largest concentration of poor people. Additionally, several other problems related to the 2010 Commonwealth Games have been highlighted by Indian investigative agencies and media outlets; these include – serious corruption by officials of the Games' .

Socio-economic impact

Financial costs

Miloon Kothari, a leading Indian expert on socio-economic development, remarked that the 2010 Commonwealth Games will create "a negative financial legacy for the country" and asked "when one in three Indians lives below the poverty line and 40% of the hungry live in India, when 46% of India's children and 55% of women are malnourished, does spending billions of dollars on a 12-day sports event build national pride or is it a matter of national shame?"

One of the outspoken critics of the Games is Mani Shankar Aiyar, former Indian Minister for Youth Affairs and Sports. In April 2007, Aiyar commented that the Games are "irrelevant to the common man" and criticized the Indian government for sanctioning billions of dollars for the Games even though India requires massive investment in social development programs. In July 2010, he remarked that he would be "unhappy if the Commonwealth Games are successful".

Azim Premji called the 2010 Commonwealth Games a "drain on public funds" and said that hosting the high-expense Games in India is not justified given that the country had more important priorities facing it, such as education, infrastructure and public health.

Social and environmental impact

Nearly 400,000 people from three large slum cluster in Delhi have been relocated since 2004. Gautam Bhan, an Indian urban planner with the University of California-Berkeley, said that the 2010 Commonwealth Games have resulted in "an unprecedented increase in the degree, frequency and scale of indiscriminate evictions without proper resettlement. We haven’t seen these levels of evictions in the last five years since the Emergency."

In response to a Right to Information (RTI) application filed for study and statements by civil society groups, a report by the Housing and Land Rights Network (HLRN) - an arm of the Habitat International Coalition - detailed the social and environmental consequences of the event. It stated that no tolerance zones for beggars are enforced in Delhi, and the city has arbitrarily arrested homeless citizens under the "Bombay Prevention of Begging Act 1959".

Labour laws violations
Campaigners in India have accused the organisers of enormous and systematic violations of labour laws at construction sites. Human Rights Law Network reports that independent investigations have discovered more than 70 cases where workers have died in accidents at construction sites since work began. Although official numbers have not been released, it is estimated that over 415,000 contract daily wage workers are working on Games projects. Nearly 50 construction workers have died in the past two years while employed on Games projects.

These represent violations of the Minimum Wages Act, 1948; Interstate Migrant Workmen (Regulation of Employment and Condition of Services) Act 1979, and the constitutionally enshrined fundamental rights per the 1982 Supreme Court of India judgement on Asiad workers. The public have been banned from the camps where workers live and work – a situation which human rights campaigners say prevents the garnering of information regarding labour conditions and number of workers.

There have been documented instances of the presence of young children at hazardous construction sites, due to a lack of child care facilities for women workers living and working in the labour camp style work sites. Furthermore, workers on the site of the main Commonwealth stadium have reportedly been issued with hard hats, yet most work in open-toed sandals and live in cramped tin tenements in which illnesses are rife. The High Court of Delhi is presently hearing a public interest petition relating to employers not paying employees for overtime and it has appointed a four-member committee to submit a report on the alleged violations of workers rights.

During the construction of the Games Village, there was controversy over financial mismanagement, profiteering by the Delhi Development Authority and private real estate companies, and inhumane working conditions.

Child labour
CNN has broadcast evidence showing children, as young as seven, being used in the construction of the game venues. According to Siddharth Kara, who provided CNN with the evidence, he documented 14 cases of child labor within a few days. In reply to a question whether it could have been just a case of kids being present at the construction site along with their parents, he replied: "It's not just kids playing in the dirt or using a hammer as a toy." He further stated about the kids: "They're told to do the work and they just do the work. They don't know that they should be in school or that they should be playing."

Even though the New Delhi chief minister Sheila Dikshit claimed that nobody had approached her, according to CNN, they had tried to contact her as far back as 23 July 2010. In spite of repeated attempts, according to them, no official reply was ever made.

Urban change

Amita Baviskar, a professor of sociology at the Institute of Economic Growth, University of Delhi argues that mega-events, like the Olympics and Commonwealth Games, are used to advance narrow agendas of urban reform that cater to the middle class and rich. She focuses on how, in preparation for the Commonwealth Games, the city's slums were bulldozed in order to make room for shopping malls and expensive real estate.

Sex slavery and prostitution boom
There has been a boom in the number of young girls, mostly from impoverished parts of India, coming to Delhi after being offered jobs by disguised criminals, only to be taken prisoner and forced into sex slavery. The number of victims is believed to be in the hundreds. Many brothels have been running English courses for sex workers and upgrading their facilities in anticipation of a business upturn during the games. Overseas prostitutes are also expected to come as tourists and ply their trade. One anti-trafficking NGO has claimed that there are reports of 40,000 women being brought in from northeastern India alone. A spokesperson said that recruits from that part of India were favoured because of their lighter skin. It has been reported that over 3,000 bar girls in Mumbai have stopped going to work; this has been blamed on an exodus to Delhi for the Commonwealth Games.

Organisational failure

Vigilance-related irregularities and Over-Invoicing
On 28 July 2010, the Central Vigilance Commission, an Indian government body created to address governmental corruption, released a report showing irregularities in up to 14 CWG projects. As per official reports, in total 129 works in 71 organisations have been inspected. The detailed preliminary findings included the award of work contracts at higher prices, poor quality assurance and management, and work contracts awarded to ineligible agencies.

There are also allegations of widespread corruption in various aspects of organising the games including procurement and awarding contracts for constructing the game venues. The Commonwealth Games Organising Committee on 5 August 2010 suspended joint director T S Darbari and M Jayachandran following the report of the three-member panel which was probing the financial irregularities related to the Queen's Baton Relay.

Also, Organising Committee treasurer Anil Khanna resigned from the post in the wake of allegations that his son's firm had secured a contract for laying synthetic courts at a tennis stadium. The GlobalPost news agency reports that scandals have come to light, such as "shadowy off-shore firms, forged emails, inexplicable payments to bogus companies and inflated bills – for every purchase from toilet paper to treadmills." Among the alleged corruption and defrauding of the games budget, toilet paper rolls valued at $2 were costed at $80, $2 soap dispensers at $60, $98 mirrors at $220, $11,830 altitude training simulators at $250,190.

Preparation delays
In September 2009, CGF chief Mike Fennell reported that the games were at risk of falling behind schedule and that it was "reasonable to conclude that the current situation poses a serious risk to the Commonwealth Games in 2010". A report by the Indian Government released several months prior found that construction work on 13 out of the 19 sports venues was behind schedule.

The secretary-general of the Indian Olympic Association Randhir Singh has also expressed his concerns regarding the current state of affairs. Singh has called for the revamp of the Organising Committee commenting that India now has to "retrieve the games". Other Indian officials have also expressed dismay at the ongoing delays but they have stated that they are confident that India will successfully host the games and do so on time.

As the Times of India reports, all CWG projects were to be completed by May 2009 and the last year should have been kept for trial runs. The newspaper further reports that the first stadium was handed over for trial runs in July 2010 only. To put the delays in perspective, Beijing National Stadium was completed much ahead of schedule for the 2008 Summer Olympics, while the venues for 2012 Summer Olympics in London are scheduled to be delivered one year before the games and the construction of the venues is on track.

In August 2010, the Cabinet Secretariat took a decision to appoint 10 officers of the rank of Joint and Additional Secretaries to oversee the progress of the construction of stadiums. Each officer is allocated a stadium and given the responsibility to ensure that the work completes in time for the games.

Mass volunteer walkout
Around 10,000 of the 22,000 selected volunteers quit, less than a week before the event. This has been blamed on a lack of training for personnel, or dissatisfaction with assignments. There are reports that some who have quit have not returned their uniforms.

Poor ticket sales and attendance
The start of the Games saw extremely poor ticket sales, with many venues near empty. In a press conference, organising chairman Suresh Kalmadi admitted that there were problems, and blamed empty venues on ticket booths not being set up outside stadiums. Commonwealth Games chief Mike Fennell admitted that many venues had been nearly empty on the opening day of the Games, saying "A number of venues do not have lots of spectators. It is one area which causes us concern". On the second day of competition, less than 100 people filled the hockey venue–the 19,000-seat MDC Stadium. Less than 20 people watched the first tennis match of the tournament in the 5,000-seat tennis stadium, and just 58 fans watched the netball opening match.

One Indian competitor tried to buy tickets for relatives online, only to be informed by the website that tickets were sold out. When he arrived to compete, he found the venue to be empty.

The streets of Delhi were deserted for the cycling road races and walking event.

Spectators' response at opening ceremony
At the opening ceremony, the chairman of the organising committee, Suresh Kalmadi, faced embarrassment, when he was booed by spectators at the start of his welcome speech to 60,000 spectators. Kalmadi came under further strain when he "thanked" the late Princess Diana for attending the opening ceremony of the games. The chairman made the blunder at a press conference saying 'Yes, Princess Diana was there,’ after which he immediately corrected himself by saying 'Prince Charles and (Camilla) the Duchess of Cornwall.

Opening ceremony
The Australian Commonwealth contingent expressed frustration over the opening ceremony, in which there were claims that the athletes and delegation support staff were "treated like cattle" and subjected to "disgraceful" and unbearable conditions. Australia's chef de mission Steve Moneghetti complained about the athletes being trapped in "absolute cauldron conditions" under the main stadium before marching for the opening ceremony. The Australians were stuck in a tunnel, where Moneghetti described the temperature as exceeding  due to a lack of airconditioning and ventilation. When attempting to move out, the Australian delegation was stopped by staff. When the contestants were finally able to move out into the arena, they were described as being emotionally affected.

Racism allegations

African countries have complained that they are getting second-class treatment from the Games organisers, in spite of them offering India a hand in the preparation of the Games. They have alleged that accommodation given to them was inferior compared to the accommodation provided to the Australian and New Zealand teams. They went on to state that India was complaining about being victims of racial bias in the reporting of the Games; while simultaneously perpetrating the same kind of racism against the African countries.

Infrastructure issues

Transport infrastructure

The Delhi Airport Metro Express built by Reliance Infrastructure and CAF Beasain missed its deadline of 31 July 2010 and the private consortium was fined Rs 112.5 million.

Venues
Less than two weeks before the opening ceremony, Fennell wrote to the Indian cabinet secretary, urging action in response to the village being "seriously compromised." He said that though team officials were impressed with the international zone and main dining area, they were "shocked" by the state of the accommodation. "The village is the cornerstone of any Games and the athletes deserve the best possible environment to prepare for their competition." The BBC published photographs of the village taken two days before 23 September showing unfinished living quarters.

New Zealand, Canada, Scotland and Northern Ireland have expressed concern about unliveable conditions. The Times of India newspaper reports that the Scottish delegation apparently submitted a photograph of a dog defecating on a bed in the games village. Hooper said that there was "excrement in places it shouldn't be" in the athletes' quarters and that members of visiting delegations had to help clean up the unsanitary things. The BBC released images of bathrooms with brown-coloured paan stains on the walls and floor, liquids on the floor, and brown paw prints on athletes' beds. Lalit Bhanot, the secretary general of the Organising Committee, rejected the complaint that sanitation was poor by saying that, due to cultural differences, there are different standards about cleanliness in India and the western world, a statement for which he was widely ridiculed in Indian and international media. Bhanot went on to say of the athletes' village that, "This is a world-class village, probably one of the best ever."

Meanwhile, Pakistan also made reservations over the condition of the athletes' village and asked for an alternate accommodation to be made available to its contingent while preparation was still in progress. The Pakistan Olympic Association president Syed Arif Hasan remarked: "We want the CGF to ensure that the athletes' village is in good condition. Athletes cannot stay at a substandard place." Hasan however added that there were no doubts over Pakistan's participation and the contingent would leave as planned.

On the other hand, England's Chef de mission Craig Hunter praised the Games Village, remarking that "the Commonwealth Games Village here [in New Delhi] is better than the Beijing Olympics". He added that the arrangements at the Games Village is much better than that at the 2008 Summer Olympics.

Canada's sports minister also supported the Games, saying that big events always face issues, and the media often exaggerates them, as Canada found during the Vancouver Winter Olympics. He added that "We are coming in full force."

Problems with functionality of equipment and infrastructure during events
On the first night of swimming, debris landed in the swimming pool, causing delays ahead of a race. It is believed that part of the ceiling or its paint had fallen off.

Before the last night of swimming finals, the filtration system broke down and the pool was turbid and murky during the warmup session and the finals; it was described as the least clear ever seen for a swimming competition. A disproportionate number of swimmers fell ill with intestinal complaints, leading to concerns over the cleanliness and sanitation of the pool.
Early suspicions rested on the quality of water in the swimming pools of the SPM Complex, but other competing teams, including South Africa, reported no such illness. Daily water quality tests were being carried out on the water of the pools, as mandated by the event standards. Additional tests were ordered after news of the illnesses, but they also did not find anything amiss. The Australian team's chief doctor, Peter Harcourt, ruled that the "chances of the [Delhi] pool being the cause of the problem is very remote" and praised the hygiene and food quality in the Delhi Games Village. He suggested that it could be a common case of Traveler's diarrhea (locally called Delhi belly), or the Australian swimmers could have contracted the stomach virus during their training camp in Kuala Lumpur, Malaysia. English Olympic and Commonwealth gold-medalist swimmer Rebecca Adlington said that the water quality was absolutely fine.

After the opening ceremony, the ground at the athletics arena was damaged, and the grass infield and the track was still being re-laid two hours before competition started.

Vandalism of Games Village by Athletes

Condoms and toilet blockages
An Indian newspaper during the games reported that used condoms flushed down the toilets in the athlete's village had caused some drains to become blocked, necessitating action by plumbers to clear the pipes.

Athletes under investigation for trashing apartments
Australian athletes have been accused of vandalizing the towers of the athletes' village they were staying in by breaking furniture and electrical fittings. Delhi Police did not press the case after the Organizing Committee refused to file a complaint while Indian external affairs minister SM Krishna dismissed it as a one-off incident.

A washing machine was hurled from the eighth floor of the same tower. Nobody on the ground was hit, but it is unclear who the culprit was. Indian newspapers have reported that the Australian Commonwealth Games Authority agreed to pay for the damages and have apologised for the incident. The Australian High Commissioner rejected the claim, stating that the incident was the result of partying and celebrations. Later comments by Australian officials have contradicted claims by Lalit Bhanot that they had admitted responsibility. Perry Crosswhite said that it was still unclear if athletes from other nations present in the tower at the time had been responsible.

Safety and security concerns
Small monkeys roam Delhi's streets and prefer heavily urbanized areas with plenty of living space among buildings. They cannot be killed because many Indians see them as sacred so instead a larger, domesticated monkey, the langur, is brought in to scare away the smaller monkeys.

On the second day of the games, three Ugandan officials were injured by a malfunctioning security barrier at the games' village, and a senior official from that country raised allegations of discrimination by Indian officials. Uganda's sports minister lashed out at Indian officials and demanded an apology for the accident. The officials had cuts and bruises and were hospitalized overnight for observation. The chairman of the Games' Organising Committee, Suresh Kalmadi, apologized to the Ugandan High Commissioner to India for the freak car accident.

Infrastructural compromise
On 21 September 2010, a footbridge under construction for the Games near the Jawaharlal Nehru Stadium collapsed, injuring at least 23 people, mainly workers, underscoring fears of poor workmanship. Commenting on the incident, Chief Minister of Delhi Sheila Dikshit controversially remarked that the footbridge was only meant for spectators and not for athletes. Following the collapse, Fennell expressed concern that conditions at the Games Village, which had "shocked the majority", would seriously compromise the entire event. The company that was building the foot bridge, P&R Infraprojects, was subsequently blacklisted by the Delhi Government and was not allowed to get government contracts.

Reportedly, progress was still slow and four or five accommodation towers built by Emaar at the Games village were unfinished, lacking facilities such as wireless internet, fitted toilets and plumbing. In addition, rubble, unused masonry and discarded bricks littered the unfinished gardens. According to sports historian Boria Majumdar, author of the Sellotape Legacy: Delhi and the Commonwealth Games, India "may have to pull a miracle." The father of Australian track cyclist Kaarle McCulloch visited his daughter at the Olympic village. A builder in Australia, Grahame McCulloch criticised the structural soundness of the village; he said "those buildings are the dodgiest things I have ever seen...so substandard". He told his daughter not to use the balcony, fearing that it was collapsible.

On 22 September 2010, part of the drop ceiling of the new Commonwealth Games weightlifting venue in New Delhi collapsed.

Indian bantamweight boxer Akhil Kumar's bed in the Games village collapsed when he sat on it. "I sat down on my bed to rest but suddenly it gave way. After that I noticed that part of it has no plywood", he said

On 27 September 2010, a South African athlete reported that a snake was present in his room in the Games Village. A day earlier, animal authorities had to be called in to evacuate a king cobra from the tennis venue.

On 7 October, a large scoreboard crashed to the ground at the rugby venue when a supporting chain snapped. The games however were due to start a week later so no major repercussions were experienced.

Terror threats
Following the 2008 Mumbai attacks, some athletes and their representative bodies expressed security fears during the games. In April 2010, during the Indian Premier League, two low intensity bombs went off outside the M. Chinnaswamy Stadium in Bangalore. Although there were no casualties, this postponed the start of the game by an hour. Following this attack, foreign cricketers like Kevin Pietersen expressed fears for their safety and questions were raised regarding the safety of athletes during the Commonwealth Games . The UK and Canada also warned about potential attacks on commercial targets in Delhi ahead of the games.

Jama Masjid incident

On 19 September 2010, unknown gunmen on a motorbike opened fire with an automatic pistol on a tourist bus outside the Jama Masjid mosque in Delhi. The attacks, which came a fortnight before the start of the games, injured two Taiwanese tourists. Two hours later, a Maruti car exploded in the vicinity, reportedly from a deliberate low-intensity pressure cooker bomb which had been assembled inside. No fatalities or major damages were reported. The incidents, which were purportedly claimed by the Indian Mujahideen, provoked fears about lack of security in the city for the upcoming games. However, police in Delhi initially denied the role of any organised terror group and instead blamed the attacks on "disgruntled youths and local criminal gangs." Officials suggested that a possible motive of the strike was to instill fear in people ahead of the Commonwealth Games.

Fear of dengue outbreak

The heaviest monsoon rains in 15 years, along with large quantities of standing water on CWG construction sites as well as in tanks and ponds, raised concerns over increased levels of mosquito-borne disease in Delhi. In the run-up to the games it was reported that 65-70 cases of dengue fever were being diagnosed each day in the city, with the number of cases "likely to hit the 3,000 mark" by the opening on 3 October.

Illness
Many swimmers were reported to have fallen ill. Initially, concerns were raised over the quality of water in the swimming pools of the SPM Complex. It was said that more than 20 percent of the English team's swimmers – about eight to 10 competitors – had been struck down with a stomach virus. The Australian team also reported that at least six of its swimmers had been sick, including Andrew Lauterstein, who had to withdraw from the 50-meter butterfly. Commonwealth Games Federation president Mike Fennell said officials would conduct tests to make sure the pools were not the source of the illness. "If there is something unsafe, you cannot swim in that water. It is a matter we have to deal with a great deal of urgency," he said.

However, other competing teams, including South Africa, reported no such illness. Daily water quality tests were being carried out on the water of the pools, as mandated by the event standards. Additional tests were ordered after news of the illnesses, but they also did not find anything amiss. The Australian team's chief doctor, Peter Harcourt, ruled that the "chances of the [Delhi] pool being the cause of the problem is very remote" and praised the hygiene and food quality in the Delhi Games Village. He suggested that it could be a common case of Traveler's diarrhea (locally called Delhi belly), or the Australian swimmers could have contracted the stomach virus during their training camp in Kuala Lumpur, Malaysia. English Olympic and Commonwealth gold-medalist swimmer Rebecca Adlington said that the water quality was absolutely fine.

Boycott
Following the withdrawal of Dani Samuels, the women's world discus champion, because "[her] safety [was] more important to them than a medal," Australia's Minister for Sport, Mark Arbib, said CWG officials expected more competitors to follow suit.

The Scottish team's departure of its first 41 boxers, rugby players, wrestlers and support staff was delayed for 48 hours, and the Welsh team set a deadline of 22 September to receive reassurances that the venues would be fit for purpose. The first batch of English athletes, which included a lawn bowls team and a men's hockey squad, said the organisers were not making nearly enough progress just a day before they were to leave. The Guardian suggested a mass walkout remained an option with the "point of no return" less than a week before the scheduled start; they claimed the "main competing countries would be likely to act in concert." They also suggested the games were on the verge of "descending into farce."

Michael Cavanagh, the chairman of Commonwealth Games Scotland, said a decision to stay away would be a joint one, as he insisted a possible knock on effects for the 2014 Commonwealth Games in Glasgow would not be a factor.  He said "In terms of withdrawal we don't see this as simply a Team Scotland decision, any decision to withdraw we would see as being a collective decision amongst the countries who are already there and already concerned. We can't allow ourselves to be influenced by thoughts of how it may impact on 2014, not when we have something as important as the safety of our athletes to consider." Phillips Idowu, the world triple jump champion, also withdrew from the Games.

Calls for boycott
Amidst allegations of blatant corruption, shoddy construction work at venues and security concerns for participating athletes, the 2010 Commonwealth Games have faced numerous boycott calls from individuals in India, England and Australia.

Within India, there were calls for boycott. Other celebrities who followed Aiyar's comments in expressing a call for boycott include former Indian cricket captain and spin bowler Bishan Singh Bedi and bestselling Indian author Chetan Bhagat.
Bedi said the "CWG organisers have taken the country for a ride" and urged international athletes to boycott the "embarrassing" Delhi games. Bhagat, who is considered a youth icon in India with a huge fan following, called the Commonwealth games the "biggest and most blatant exercise in mass corruption since the country won independence six decades ago." Bhagat, who has sold more than 4 million books in India, also urged his readers to boycott the games event and not to watch them on TV, thereby using the "golden chance" to "put the corrupt and insensitive government to shame."

The Jat community seeking reservation under the OBC quota have also planned to use the Commonwealth games as a platform and force the Indian government to relent to their needs.

Other countries also threatened to boycott the games. Considering the potential impact of a terror threat and other security concerns, rumors arose about a boycott of the Delhi Commonwealth Games by major participating nations including Scotland, England and New Zealand. However, the rumors were soon put to rest by Commonwealth games committees in each of these countries who expressed a general level of satisfaction with the security arrangements.

Australian quadruple Olympic gold medal winning swimmer Dawn Fraser called for Australia to boycott the games event, citing fears of a tragedy similar to that which unfolded in the Munich Olympics of 1972. Fraser pronounced that reports of missed construction deadlines and other irregularities in games planning meant Indian authorities' "word for providing security should not be taken at its face value." However, the Australian Commonwealth Games Organising Committee was quick to dismiss Fraser's fears with ACGA chief executive, Perry Crosswhite saying he believed there will be no security issues during the games event. John Coates, Australia's Olympic chief, came down hard on the organisers, alleging teams were being forced to temporary accommodation at hotels. "I don't think it is a cultural thing. When you agree to host [the Games], you are required to provide the basics in terms of health and hygiene for the athletes. The Games shouldn't have been awarded to Delhi in hindsight."

Sporting controversies

Doping
Prior to the Games, four wrestlers, a shot-putter and two swimmers who were all part of India's Games squad tested positive for methylhexaneamine. Four others, who were not picked for the Games in the Indian capital, also failed drug tests conducted at the various training camps across the country.

Oludamola Osayomi, the winner of the women's 100-metre sprint event, was reported to have tested positive for a "banned substance" which was later revealed to be the stimulant methylhexaneamine. Another Nigerian athlete, hurdler Samuel Okon who placed sixth in the 110 metres hurdles, was reported to have tested positive for the same drug.

In July 2011, three of the four women from India's gold-medal winning 400-metre-relay team tested positive for performance-enhancing drugs. Two of the racers, Sini Jose and Jauna Murmu, tested positive for the anabolic steroid methandienone, and Tiana Mary Thomas tested positive for epi-methandienone.

Archery
While the audience's behaviour at the archery event provoked criticism from the English team, the silver medallist, Alison Williamson, praised it on the other hand. Earlier reports held that the English team was upset because the loud chant of the crowd during the women's recurve event had distracted the archers. In an action condemned in the Indian media, an English archery official allegedly abused an Indian coach, telling him to "f*** off." The comment came after the Indian team registered a one-point win over England to claim the gold medal. The Indian archery head coach, Limba Ram, walked over to shake hands with officials of the rival team. In response, an English official showed his elbow in a gesture before uttering the remarks. Britain's archery team leader said she was unaware of the incident and added, "[the Indian coach] must find out whether the person was one among us. If he was not wearing a red jersey, he would not be part of the side. I will speak to the Indian coach about it." Limba Ram said that he failed to identify the person as he had chosen to ignore the one-off incident. There have also been accusations that Ram was called a monkey on two different occasions by an English official.

Athletics

During the Final of the Women's 100m sprint final, a controversy was caused by the eventual disqualification of Sally Pearson of Australia.  She had won the race on the third attempted start after one start was delayed because of excessive crowd noise and the second due to a false start by Laura Turner of England. Pearson was disqualified because she was deemed to have false-started in the second attempted restart along with Turner. This was as a direct result of a protest lodged by Team England. The controversy was caused as only Turner was disqualified from the race during the race because of a false start and not Pearson. Turner ran the race under protest. Pearson and other athletes were not informed of the protest until four hours after the race, as they were waiting to begin the medal presentation for the race. Commonwealth Games Federation president Mike Fennell called Pearson's treatment "unsatisfactory" and that the whole situation was caused by an "unacceptable communications blunder".

Boxing
During the weigh-in for the boxing competition, the scales were giving inaccurate readings with athletes recording higher body weights on the official scales. The scales were deemed to be broken and the weigh-in was delayed 24 hours to find and calibrate new scales. The initial wrong measurements led to angry shouting between coaches, athletes and organisers. During the boxing competition there have been claims made by various teams including England and Botswana that jabs were not being scored by judges. This was attributed to the removal of a white scoring zone placed on the boxers gloves which is usually present in amateur boxing events. The BBC commentating team also claimed there to be a bias in judges scores towards Indian competitors.

Cycling
During the final of the Men's Keirin, Malaysian Azizulhasni Awang was disqualified for aggressive interference when he forced his way past two competitors. Race winner Josiah Ng said he was "mystified" over Awang's disqualification. In the semi-final round of the keirin, Australia's Shane Perkins was disqualified for dangerous riding with the official reason not being made clear. Perkins subsequently won the classification race and was described by Chris Boardman from the BBC to "have aimed an angry V-sign at officials"; he gestured to the judges with his index and middle finger held together.  No subsequent action was taken against Perkins who later said, "the officials need to go back to school", referencing poor decisions he felt had been made in the sprint and keirin events.

Swimming
On another occasion, South African swimmer Roland Schoeman came under criticism when he referred to the crowd at the swimming as "going on like monkeys" in a post-race poolside interview. Schoeman's remarks came after he narrowly avoided being disqualified as he and England's Simon Burnett fell in at the start of the 50m freestyle when distracted by the crowd noise. The swimming has been persistently affected by Indian spectators ignoring etiquette and shouting out while the competitors were preparing for the start. His comment was regarded as possibly being a racial ethnic slur, although he later said that the word was commonly used in South Africa to refer to mischievous behaviour. At an official press conference, organising committee secretary-general Lalit Bhanot took the complaints about monkeys literally. Not being aware of the complaints, Bhanot felt Delhi's wildlife was at issue: "We know especially at the swimming pool there are a lot of monkeys and we have made efforts to keep them away from the swimming pool."

Wrestling
Australian wrestler Hassene Fkiri was ejected from the 96 kg Greco-Roman competition and stripped of the silver medal after making an obscene gesture at the international FILA judges during the final. According to an Australian official, Fkiri was furious at his Indian rival Anil Kumar, who he accused of breaking the rules a number of times in the first period by holding Fkiri around the neck and head with two hands. The Australian received his first warning after he made a comment to the referee as he walked off the mat at the end of the two-minute period; when Kumar repeated the same move in the next round, Fkiri headbutted him and was issued a second warning. He then proceeded to swing his arms uncontrollably afterwards, which resulted in his third warning and eventual disqualification. After losing, Fkiri refused to shake hands with the victor.

Reactions and responses
Responding to media concerns, the organisers said there were 48 hours to save the Games after warnings of a pull out.

Numerous Bollywood actors also expressed their dismay at the state of the Games.

Four days before the start of the games, tickets for the opening, closing ceremonies, and the 100 m athletics were still not sold out.

The Sydney Morning Herald wrote that despite Kalmadi's "blind optimism", the games were not going to be the best ever. Instead, it wrote that it was "probably the most interesting."

The opening ceremony played a key role in improving the image of the Games. As athletes arrived and competitions started, many earlier critics changed their view. The Australian Sports Minister said that India could now aim for the Olympics, and the President of the International Olympic Committee, Jacques Rogge, said that India had made a good foundation for a future Olympics bid. As the Games concluded, many observers remarked that they began on an apprehensive note, but were an exceptional experience with a largely positive ending. Some observers accused sections of the media of bias, unfair expectations, and negative reporting.

Within India, the Games saw criticism due to the Games' origins as a celebration of the British Empire, with Arindam Chaudhuri arguing for India's disassociation from the "slavish games" which he viewed as a "celebration of racial discrimination, colonialism [and] imperialism".

Criticism by Mani Shankar Aiyar
Mani Shankar Aiyar, a senior member of the ruling Indian National Congress party and former Minister of Youth and Sports Affairs was an early whistleblower from the Indian Union Cabinet who expressed concern over extensive delays in preparation leading to unplanned expenses which he said, could have been utilized for "ensuring a better sporting future for Indian children by providing them sports training". Aiyar also said that he would be "unhappy" if the Games were a success and wished for the "Commonwealth Games to be spoiled."

Aiyar's frank media admission proved a public embarrassment for Commonwealth Games Organising Committee chairman Suresh Kalmadi who labelled him "anti national" for wishing that the Commonwealth Games are "spoilt." Kalmadi's remark received extensive criticism in Indian media.

Aiyar also told an Australian TV channel that India is "probably the poorest country of the Commonwealth". Bangladesh, among other countries, has a lower GDP per capita/purchasing power parity.

Allegations of corruption and financial irregularities
The day after the conclusion of the Games, the Indian Government announced formation of a special committee to probe the allegations of corruption and mismanagement against the Organizing Committee (OC). The probe committee was led by former Comptroller and Auditor General of India V. K. Shunglu. This probe was in addition to the Directorate General of Income Tax Investigation, Central Bureau of Investigation (CBI), Enforcement Directorate, and Central Vigilance Commission (CVC) investigations already underway. The then Prime Minister, Dr. Manmohan Singh, had promised in mid-August, when reports of the bungling first surfaced, that corrupt officials will be given "severe and exemplary" punishment after the Games. The committee was given three months time to submit its report.

A total of 53 corruption cases were being examined by the CVC. As of September 2012, 28 of them were still in different stages of investigation, 13 were referred to CBI for further investigation and 12 were closed.

Timing-Scoring-Result (TSR) case
This case relates to allegations of corruption in awarding TSR system contract to a Swiss firm

CBI investigation and chargesheet
On 25 April 2011, CBI arrested former CWG Organising Committee (OC) chairman Suresh Kalmadi in the Timing-Scoring-Result (TSR) case. He was arrested under Sections 120 B (criminal conspiracy) and 420 (cheating) of the Indian Penal Code.

On 20 May 2011, CBI filed the first chargesheet in a special CBI court against Kalmadi. The CBI alleged that he was the main accused in awarding TSR system contract to a Swiss firm. The chargesheet said, "Kalmadi is the main accused as he was the person with all supreme powers. He had the supreme over-riding powers in the Organising Committee of the CWG, 2010." In addition to Kalmadi, the CBI named two companies and eight persons including OC former Secretary General Lalit Bhanot and former Director General VK Verma as accused.

The accused were charged under various provisions of the Indian Penal Code sections dealing with criminal conspiracy, forging documents and using fake documents as genuine, Section 13 (1) (d) of the Prevention of Corruption Act.

Two bids were received for TSR contract from Swiss Timing and MSL Spain and they were opened on 4 November 2009. However, much before that, on 12 October 2009, Kalmadi and Verma had announced that the contract would be awarded to Swiss Timing.

Trial
On 4 February 2013, the court of special CBI judge Ravinder Kaur found sufficient prima facie evidence and ordered framing of charges against all the accused. The charges framed were: cheating, forgery, criminal conspiracy and causing a loss of over Rs 900 million under the Prevention of Corruption Act. As the accused pleaded not guilty, the court ordered that daily Criminal trial (for 5 days a week) will begin from 20 February.

Queen's Baton Relay (QBR) case

The QBR event was held on 29 October 2009. The allegation was that, the Organising Committee (OC) awarded the work of transportation in QBR event to AM Car and Van Hire Ltd at excessively high rates without following a standard tender process.

After completing investigations, CBI filed its second charge-sheet (after the charge-sheet in TSR case) in a special CBI court in Delhi. The CBI named OC officials T S Darbari, Sanjay Mohindroo, Jeychandran and London-based businessman Ashish Patel and his two companies AM Car n Van Hire and AM Films. The chargesheet alleged that OC members conspired to award contracts of local transportation and others to Patel's companies at excessive rates during the event held in London in 2009.

The accused were charged under Indian Penal Code sections relating to criminal conspiracy to cheat and forgery along with violations of Prevention of Corruption Act.

Venue Development Support case
However, it was alleged that Prime Minister appointed VK Shunglu Committee found serious cases of forgery and irregularity with the contract. The committee said that, "Undue pressure was brought within the OC for engaging the company for the contract" and recommended that CBI or ED should take up the case for appropriate action.

Based on Shunglu Committee's findings, CBI registered an FIR against Suresh Kalmadi, Lalit Bhanot and AK Mattoo on 23 August 2012.

On 23 March 2014, the Hindustan Times reported that "...the investigation into the alleged irregularities committed is stumbling with the CBI having closed its FIR related to grant of two contracts to a Swiss firm for lack of evidence."

Other cases
CBI sources revealed in July 2012 that the probe against alleged corruption in construction of Barapullah Flyover and grant of Bail-out Package to EMAAR MGF is likely to be closed in the absence of substantiating evidence.

See also
List of scandals in India
Concerns and controversies over the 2008 Summer Olympics
Concerns and controversies over the 2010 Winter Olympics
2G spectrum case
Contractor Mafias — construction mafias, part of the Mafia Raj in India
Corruption in India
Corruption Perceptions Index
Indian political scandals
Rent seeking
The Lokpal Bill, 2011
Jan Lokpal Bill

References

 

2010 Commonwealth Games
21st-century scandals
Cover-ups
Criminal investigation
Commonwealth Games controversies
2010 controversies
2010 scandals
2010 in Indian sport
Political corruption in India
Scandals in India
Manmohan Singh administration
Corruption in Delhi